Hard Line is the fourth album by the American roots rock band The Blasters, released in 1985. Dave Alvin quit the band shortly after the album's release. The album peaked at No. 86 on the Billboard 200.

The song "Dark Night" was featured in the film From Dusk Till Dawn.

Production
The album was produced by Jeff Eyrich, who had attended the same high school as the Alvins. John Cougar Mellencamp wrote and produced one song; Mellencamp's producer, Don Gehman, produced "Just Another Sunday". The album was recorded in Los Angeles and Nashville. Stan Lynch, David Hidalgo, and Larry Taylor appear on Hard Line.

Critical reception
Trouser Press wrote that the "highlights include 'Trouble Bound' and 'Help You Dream', both featuring the Jordanaires." The Washington Post thought that "Dave Alvin's songwriting has grown dramatically -- the melodies are finally as prominent as the rhythms, and the lyrics tell the hand-me-down stories of the best folk songs." The Chicago Tribune called Dave Alvin "one of the most underrated lyricists in popular music." The Los Angeles Times wrote that "the Blasters [have] become secure enough musically to lower the instrumental voltage and let Phil Alvin’s vocals take center stage." The Sun Sentinel opined that "the Blasters sound as if they took a long trip through the United States and sponged up every pop music form they ran into."

Track listing
All tracks written by Dave Alvin, except where noted.

Personnel
The Blasters
Phil Alvin – vocals, guitar
John Bazz – bass guitar
Dave Alvin – lead guitar
Bill Bateman – drums

References

Further reading 
 

1985 albums
The Blasters albums
Slash Records albums
Albums produced by Jeff Eyrich